Lycée Paul Éluard is a senior high school/sixth-form college in Saint-Denis, Seine-Saint-Denis, France, in the Paris metropolitan area.

 the school has fewer than 300 employees, including about 200 teachers, and about 1,700 students.

References

External links
 Lycée Paul Éluard 

Lycées in Seine-Saint-Denis